Cheongdo County (Cheongdo-gun) is a county in North Gyeongsang Province, South Korea.  It is connected to the national transportation grid by the Gyeongbu Line railroad and the Daegu-Busan Expressway.  The seat of government is located in the center of the county, in Hwayang-eup.

In the Samhan period, Cheongdo may have been the site of the small polity of Ieso-guk.  It was later absorbed into Silla, and gained its current name of "Cheongdo" in 940.  The county's nine subdivisions were established in 1919.  The county government moved to its current location in 1961.  In 1966, the New Village Movement began in Sindo 1-ri, Cheongdo-eup.

Every year Cheongdo is host to an international bullfighting festival.

The slogan for Cheongdo is "Singgreen Cheongdo."

Administrative divisions
Cheongdo is divided into two eup and seven myeon, as below.  These in turn are divided into 212 ri, and 668 natural villages (jayeon burak).

Twin towns – sister cities
Cheongdo is twinned with:

  Gangnam-gu, South Korea 
  Jung-gu, South Korea
  Nenjiang, China

Festivals 
 Bullfighting Festival 
 Persimmon (Bansi) Festival 
 Lantern Festival

Culture

Museums 

 Cheongdo Museum

Monuments 

 Cheongdo Memorial Park of Saemaeul Undong

Parks 

 Unmunsan National Recreational Forest

experiences 

 Seonamseowon Confucian Academy
 Cheongdo Hwarang-themed Cultural Park Auto-camping Site
 Cheongdo Bicycle Park Camping Site
 Cheongdo Rail Bike
 Cheongdo Hwarang-themed Cultural Park
 Comedy Cheolgabang Theater
 Korea Comedy Town

Other important spots 

 Cheongdo Bullfighting Stadium
 Cheongdo Wine Tunnel
 Cheongdo Provence

Architecture

Historical 

 Songamjeongsa House
 Unmunsa Temple

Foreigners 
As Cheongdo is a small town, with a population that is just over 50,000, there is not a high number of foreigners. However, there are a few foreigners that are living there as English teachers through the EPIK Program. Unfortunately, it is very rare to come across a local Cheongdo resident that speaks English. Learning basic Korean is an essential for living in Cheongdo.

Climate & Weather 
Much like the rest of Korea, Cheongdo has four distinct seasons. Summers in Cheongdo can be extremely hot as Cheongdo is only 30 minutes away from Daegu by train. Daegu is known to be one of the hottest cities in South Korea, due to the surrounding mountains that trap all the heat.

Winters can be rather cold, reaching -15 degrees Celsius on occasion. Furthermore, the air is extremely dry during the winter time.

Both Autumn and Spring are rather mild, no extreme weather conditions for either. However, during Spring, typically in April, the air quality is very poor. It is very common to see locals protecting themselves with face masks against the "yellow dust."

See also
 Geography of South Korea
 Subdivisions of South Korea

References

External links

County government website

 
Counties of North Gyeongsang Province